Nina Morgan-Jones (born in South Wales) is a London/Hollywood based fashion designer and stylist and co-founder of the fashion Company ROMP.

Biography
At the age of 24, her fashion collection was first shown during London Fashion Week and then went on to sell in the salons of Pret-a-Porter (Paris), Atmosphere (Paris) and The Train (New York and Japan).

Morgan-Jones’ style is inspired by the 30s, film noir and 1970's London.

ROMP was successful internationally as a natural products brand, selling leather, sheepskin and silk clothing. In 2007 ROMP teamed up with a European tannery and produced an organic collection of Soil Association Certified Organic leather and denim clothing and accessories. Morgan-Jones worked with organic pioneer Greg Sturmer on the development of the collection.

ROMP was the subject of a BBC world documentary  and Morgan-Jones’ designs have been featured in magazines such as Elle, Vogue, Marie Claire and Condé Nast Traveller.

Her designs have since been commissioned by Hollywood shows such as American Idol and Melrose Place and have been featured on the red carpet and on stage for shows such as the MTV Video Music Awards and the Academy Awards.

ROMP opened its first USA boutique in 2008 on West 3rd Street, Los Angeles. She lives between London, Los Angeles and St Tropez, working on the Romp Boutique Collection and as a freelance design consultant.

References

External links
https://rompboutique.com
Financial  Times: Articles about ROMP

Living people
Welsh fashion designers
British women fashion designers
Year of birth missing (living people)
Fashion stylists